Agkistrocerus megerlei is a species of horse flies in the family Tabanidae.

Distribution
United States.

References

Tabanidae
Insects described in 1828
Taxa named by Christian Rudolph Wilhelm Wiedemann
Diptera of North America